The 2018–19 WCBA season was the 17th season of the Women's Chinese Basketball Association. Beijing Great Wall were the defending champions. The league was expanded from 14 teams to 18 teams.

Team changes

Player movement

Foreign Players

Standings

Playoffs

Venues

References

External links
 WCBA Official Website  (in Chinese)

 
2018-19
2018–19 in Chinese basketball
Chn
Chn
basketball
basketball